Sterakovou was a Greek Cypriot agricultural settlement. In 1974 it was abandoned. It's part of Sotira, Limassol.

References

Sotira, Limassol